A safe harbor or harbour is literally a "place of shelter and safety, esp. for ships". It is used in many contexts:

Film and television
 Safe harbor (broadcasting), established in 1978 in the US, the time period in a television schedule during which programs with adult content can air
 Safe Harbor (TV series), a 1999 television drama starring Gregory Harrison and Rue McClanahan
 "The Safe Harbor", a 2006 episode of The O.C. television series
 Safe Harbor, a 2006 made-for-television movie starring Tracey Gold and Steve Bacic, and which aired on Lifetime in the US
 Safe Harbour (film), a 2007 direct-to-video film directed by Bill Corcoran
 Safe Harbor (film), a 2009 television movie starring Treat Williams and Nancy Travis
 Safe Harbour (Australian TV series), a 2017 Australian television drama series

Law and regulations
 Safe harbor (law), a provision of a statute or a regulation that specifies that certain conduct will be deemed not to violate a given rule
 International Safe Harbor Privacy Principles, a process for U.S. companies to comply with the EU Directive on the protection of personal data
 DMCA safe harbor, which shields online service providers from liability for facilitating their users' copyright infringement as long as they comply with certain requirements, such as accepting "take down" notices
 Place of refuge for ships, also called a safe harbor, where a ship in distress can shelter

Publishing
 Safe Harbour (novel), a 2003 novel by Danielle Steel 
 Safe Harbor (novel), a 2004 novel by Radclyffe

Places
 Safe Harbour, Newfoundland and Labrador, Canada
 Safe Harbor, Pennsylvania, U.S.
 Safe Harbor Dam, Susquehanna River, U.S.

Other uses
 Safe harbor (commerce), function as a form of shark repellent used to thwart hostile takeovers
 Safe Harbor Certified Seafood, a brand of mercury tested seafood products
 Safe Harbor (locus), a location in a genome for the insertion of novel DNA that does not perturb endogenous gene activity or promote cancer.

See also 
 Safe haven (disambiguation)
 Safe house